Seneca State Forest is a state forest located in Pocahontas County, West Virginia. Created in 1924, it is the oldest state forest in West Virginia.

The West Virginia Division of Natural Resources rents eight fully equipped pioneer cabins. As of 2013, the Thorny Mountain Fire Tower is also being renovated and will be available for overnight rentals.

Public hunting and fishing are available in the forest. Visitors can boat on the  Seneca Lake. The forest contains a section of the Allegheny Trail and other trails and is near the Greenbrier River Trail.

A Civilian Conservation Corps camp was once located near the current Seneca State Forest office.  CCC-related resources in the forest were listed on the National Register of Historic Places in 2018.

References

External links
 

West Virginia state forests
Protected areas of Pocahontas County, West Virginia
Campgrounds in West Virginia
National Register of Historic Places in Pocahontas County, West Virginia
Historic districts in West Virginia